Frank Alan Ritchie Hunter (16 November 1913 in Edinburgh – 25 April 2002) was a Scottish athlete who competed in the 1934 British Empire Games.

At the 1934 Empire Games he won the gold medal in the 440 yards hurdles event. He was also a member of the Scottish relay team which won the bronze medal in the 4×440 yards competition. In the 440 yards contest he finished sixth.

External links
Profile at TOPS in athletics
Herald Scotland obituary

1913 births
2002 deaths
Sportspeople from Edinburgh
Scottish male hurdlers
Athletes (track and field) at the 1934 British Empire Games
Commonwealth Games gold medallists for Scotland
Commonwealth Games bronze medallists for Scotland
Commonwealth Games medallists in athletics
Medallists at the 1934 British Empire Games